April 2018 Kabul suicide bombing may refer to:
22 April 2018 Kabul suicide bombing
30 April 2018 Kabul suicide bombings